Kaimoor Wildlife Sanctuary is located in Sonbhadra and Mirzapur districts of southeastern Uttar Pradesh. The sanctuary reaches generally east and west along the Kaimur Range, extending to the Son River at its eastern end, and to the border of Madhya Pradesh at its western end. It was established in 1982. 

The vegetation consists of 500 square kilometers of verdant land.  The topography of the region is as varied as the types of animals that it houses.

Access

By air
The nearest airport is babatpur, varanasi.

By rail 
The nearest railhead is Robertsganj railway station.

By road 
Kaimoor is accessible by road from Varanasi and Mirzapur (100 km).  The nearest town, Robertsganj, 3 km away, is connected by bus services to major centres in the region.

Attractions 
The wildlife population comprises leopard, blackbuck, chital, chinkara, ratel and peafowl.
The main species of wild animals found in the sanctuary are those of antelope, blue bull, wild cat, karakal, and bijju. There are quite a few varieties of local and migratory birds forming a large part of the wild population.

Important vegetation includes saal, sheesham teek, mahua, jamun, siddha, salai, koraiya and jheengar.

External links 
 http://www.onlytravelguide.com/uttar-pradesh/adventure-wildlife/kaimoor-wildlife-sanctuary.php
 https://web.archive.org/web/20081203010122/http://www.indiantigers.com/kaimoor-sanctuary.html

Wildlife sanctuaries in Uttar Pradesh
Tourist attractions in Sonbhadra district
Mirzapur district
Lower Gangetic Plains moist deciduous forests
1982 establishments in Uttar Pradesh
Protected areas established in 1982